The Pejar Dam is an earth and rock-filled embankment dam with an uncontrolled spillway across the Wollondilly River, located in the Southern Tablelands region of New South Wales, Australia. The impounded  reservoir is also called Pejar Dam.

Location and features
The dam was completed in 1979 by the New South Wales Department of Works for the Goulburn City Council to augment the water supply.

It is one of three water storage facilities serving the city, and is used to augment the water supply when Sooley Dam is unable to maintain enough water in Rossi Weir, from which Goulburn's water filtration plant is supplied. Water is released from the dam down the Wollondilly River where due to issues of loss the water fails to arrive at Rossi weir, upstream from Goulburn. Water is actually pumped to the city's water treatment works from Rossi Weir which is pumped down from Sooley Dam then and distributed to Goulburn's reticulation system for consumption.

Recreation
The Pejar Dam is stocked with rainbow and brown trout and is a popular spot for trout anglers.

Powered and unpowered boating is permitted on the reservoir; with access via a gravel launch ramp. The reservoir is suitable for kayaks and canoes. Barbeques, picnic shelters, untreated water, and rubbish bins are provided. Swimming is not permitted. Camping is also not permitted at Pejar Dam.

Criticism

In theory Pejar Dam represents 60% of Goulburn's’ water, because of its size in proportion to the total storage. In practice, Pejar Dam does not perform near this level because it is not catching and then delivering that amount of water to Goulburn. This is because Pejar Dam has no engineered link to the City and no engineered link to the river.

In May 2005, the Goulburn City Council announced that, as a result of prolonged drought conditions, storage had reached a crisis point as dam levels fell to 10% of capacity. Even though there had been no significant rain since December 2004 Sooley Dam had maintained a capacity of 70%. Despite this, the council enforced the strictest of water restrictions and released a politically motivated statement that the city was likely to run out of the water by early-2006.  In November 2005, although the drought has broken in districts surrounding the region, the dam was still 11% full.

This was a clear breach of the operating rules. Council figures show that over the period of this release from the dam, the city experienced the largest amount of water lost from storage on record. About  of water was unaccounted for, or about 4 months supply at that time. This is the equivalent of 70% of what was in Pejar, lost. By April 2006, this level has dropped to 0.1% of capacity. On 21 April 2006 the Pejar Dam was declared officially empty after the local water authority emptied the dam.

Hydrology studies
It has become evident from Councils’ 2007 hydrology studies, that Pejar Dam doesn’t yield as much water as it was originally estimated to yield, particularly in drought years. Pejar Dam was last full in November 2000. Five years later, in May 2006, it was empty. It remained empty until heavy, specific rain in June 2007. As of 2008, Pejar Dam was about 50% capacity. During this same period Sooley Dam did not drop below 70% of storage. Sooley obviously has a better yield than Pejar as a result of its catchment location and ability to draw flood water back form the river for storage. In addition, Sooley Dams’ pipeline and short water transfer to Goulburn also contributes to its better supply performance.

See also

 List of reservoirs and dams in New South Wales

References

External links
New South Wales Department of Agriculture drought maps (viewed 14 November 2005)
Weekly demand and storage information for Goulburn and Marulan water. Goulburn Mulwaree Council
Pejar pipeline plan - Goulburn Water

Dams in New South Wales
Dams completed in 1980
Southern Tablelands
Embankment dams
Earth-filled dams
Rock-filled dams